Originally produced by Minolta, and currently produced by Sony, the AF Macro 50mm 2.8 is a macro prime photographic lens compatible with cameras using the Minolta A-mount and Sony A-mount lens mounts.

See also
 List of Minolta A-mount lenses
 list of other A-mount lenses

Sources
Dyxum lens data

External links
Sony: SAL-50M28: 50mm F2.8 Macro Lens

Camera lenses introduced in 1985
50
Minolta 050mm f/2.8